The  was the name under which the Parti Communiste du Québec ran candidates from 1944 to 1956, after the banning of the Communist Party of Canada in 1941. Its English counterpart was the Labor-Progressive Party, whose candidate Fred Rose was elected to the House of Commons of Canada for the riding of Cartier in 1943.

The POP took its current name, the Parti Communiste du Québec, in 1960.

See also
 Parti Communiste du Québec
 Politics of Quebec
 List of Quebec general elections
 National Assembly of Quebec
 Timeline of Quebec history
 List of political parties in Quebec

External links
 Parti communiste du Québec website
 National Assembly historical information
 La Politique québécoise sur le Web

Communist Party of Canada mass organizations
Labour parties in Canada
Provincial political parties in Quebec
1960 disestablishments in Quebec
Political parties disestablished in 1960